, is a Japanese animation studio established on February 9, 2009.

Works

Television series

ONAs

OVAs

References

External links
Official website 

 
Japanese animation studios
Mass media companies established in 2009
Japanese companies established in 2009
Suginami
Animation studios in Tokyo